Granite Lake is a lake on the Kawdy Plateau of the Northern Interior of British Columbia, Canada. It is located northwest of the junction of the Nahlin and Tuya rivers in Cassiar Land District. 

A roughly equidimensional granodiorite pluton outcrops adjacent to Granite Lake.

Granite Lake is one of three lakes most commonly used to gain access to the Level Mountain shield volcano by float plane, the other two being Hatin Lake and Ketchum Lake.

References

External links

Lakes of British Columbia
Stikine Plateau
Cassiar Land District